Veraguas is a province of Panama, located in the centre-west of the country. The capital is the city of Santiago de Veraguas. It is the only Panamanian province to border both the Atlantic and Pacific oceans. It covers an area of 10,587.6 km² and in 2019 it had an estimated population of 247,644.

History 
Veraguas was originally inhabited by the Veraguas culture.

Veraguas was explored by Christopher Columbus on his fourth voyage. He tried to establish the first colony in the new Spanish mainland but failed due to resistance from Indigenous peoples. Diego de Nicuesa also tried to establish a colony and failed, which made him create a colony to fight against the Indigenous population, which he named Nombre de Dios. Its capital, Santiago de Veraguas, was founded about 1636.

It is said that its name comes from the indigenous word "Veracua" or "Viragua", though other theories abound. It is the only province in Panama with coastlines on both the Caribbean Sea and the Pacific Ocean. The majority of people live on the Pacific side; the Caribbean coast is mostly uninhabited.

Tourism 
Veraguas has many groups of inhabitants, mainly of Spanish/Indigenous origin named campesinos. This land offers tourists and visitors close contact with nature. Forests, mountains, coasts, and islands where there are more than 200 varieties of orchids; more than 400 species of birds, in addition to mammals, reptiles, and insects.

Veraguas has various national parks. The Coiba National Park, (with the largest coral reef of the Pacific Coast of America), Cerro Hoya National Park (covers the southwest part of the Azuero Peninsula and the sea that surrounds it), Santa Fe National Park (a forest in the northern region), La Yeguada Forest reserve (with a great artificial lake for the production of electricity) and El Montuoso Forest reserve.

Beaches such as Playa Santa Catalina, Playa Mariato, Malena, and Torio offer great places for recreation, surfing, and fishing. Other famous touristic areas is the Iglesia de San Francisco de la Montaña. This church has a Baroque architecture and dates back to 1727. It was declared a National Historical Monument on January 27, 1937.

Administrative divisions 
Veraguas Province is divided into 12 distritos (districts) and subdivided into 104 corregimientos.

See also 
Veragua
Veraguas Club Deportivo, a football team
F.C. Veraguas 2010, a football team

References

External links 

Official website of Santiago de Veraguas

 
Provinces of Panama